A Chair in a Room: Greenwater is a virtual reality horror 3D video game, developed and published by British studio Wolf & Wood Interactive Ltd., for Microsoft Windows and PlayStation 4.

Gameplay
Gameplay includes interaction and narrative storytelling and the game story is divided into six chapters, with each of around 20 to 30 minutes in length with intervals in play.

Reception
The game won the "Viveport Developer Award 2017: Community Choice" award.

References

External links
Official website

2016 video games
Action video games
Windows games
Windows-only games
Video games developed in the United Kingdom
Virtual reality games